Juanjuan Garese (born 25 January 1999) is an Uruguayan rugby union player, currently playing for Súper Liga Americana de Rugby side Peñarol. His preferred position is lock or flanker.

Professional career
Garese signed for Súper Liga Americana de Rugby side Peñarol ahead of the 2020 Súper Liga Americana de Rugby season, before re-signing ahead of the 2021 Súper Liga Americana de Rugby season. He has also represented the Uruguay national team.

References

External links
itsrugby.co.uk Profile

1999 births
Living people
Uruguayan rugby union players
Rugby union locks
Rugby union flankers
Peñarol Rugby players
Uruguay international rugby union players